London and Glasgow Shipbuilding Company, also known as the London and Glasgow Engineering and Iron Shipbuilding Company, was a shipbuilding firm established in 1864 by a consortium of London bankers, including the Glasgow engineer James Rodger. They acquired the Middleton Yard in Govan in 1864, and soon acquired more land at Ron Bank in Govan which belonged to the Lochhead family. The old Lochhead land lay between Robert Napier and Sons "Old Yard" and the Middleton Yard allowing expansion to the west. London & Glasgow Engineering and Iron Shipbuilding Co. Ltd. also bought land at Lancefield on the northern side of the River Clyde and established a boiler workshop there.

Many ships were also built for the Royal Navy at the Middleton Yard; amongst them was the 10,000 ton , a first class armoured cruiser launched in January 1904. In 1910 London & Glasgow Engineering and Iron Shipbuilding Co. Ltd. acquired Napier's Govan East Yard (New Yard) from the owners William Beardmore and Co. Now as well as having the boiler shop at Lancefield and an engine works at Anderston Quay the London & Glasgow now owned the yards from Highland Lane up to Mackie & Thompson at Napier's "Old Yard".

In 1912 Harland and Wolff Limited acquired both the Middleton and Govan East Yard from London & Glasgow Engineering and Iron Shipbuilding Co. Ltd. along with the Napier's "Old Yard" from Mackie & Thomson, creating one large yard which ran until 1962.

List of ships built

 SS Osterley, launched 27 January 1909
, launched 20 March 1913, completed January 1914, mined and sunk 9 August 1915

References
http://www.gracesguide.co.uk/London_and_Glasgow_Shipbuilding_Co
Govan-Built

Specific

External links
List of ships built at Middleton Yard

Manufacturing companies established in 1864
British companies established in 1864
Defunct shipbuilding companies of Scotland